NAIL may refer to:
 New approaches to international law (NAIL)
 Neurotics Anonymous, abbreviated NAIL to avoid confusion with Narcotics Anonymous (NA)

See also
Nail (disambiguation)